Covasna County is a county (județ) of Romania, in eastern Transylvania, with the county seat at Sfântu Gheorghe.

Demographics

In 2002 the ethnic composition of the county was as follows:
 Hungarians – 73.58% (or 164,158)
 Romanians – 23.28% (or 51,790)
 Romani – 2.68% (or 5,973)

According to the 2011 census, the composition of the county was:

 Hungarians – 73.74% (or 150,468)
 Romanians – 22.02% (or 45,021)
 Romani – 4.05% (or 8,267)
 Others - 0.19%

Covasna County has the second-greatest percentage of Hungarian population in Romania, just behind the neighboring county of Harghita. The Hungarians of Covasna are primarily Székelys.

Geography

The main part of the relief consists of mountains from the Eastern Carpathians group. Most localities can be found in the valleys and depressions located along the different rivers crossing the county. The main river is the Olt River; along its banks lies the capital city Sfântu Gheorghe.

Neighbours

 Vrancea County and Bacău County in the east
 Brașov County in the west
 Harghita County in the north
 Buzău County in the south

Economy

Covasna County's industry's main sectors are food industry (33.79%), ready-made garment and textile (21.93%), wood and wooden products (14.98%), metals, machines and automotive suppliers (10.31%), building materials (9.68%). Other sectors of industry are chemicals (4.67%), toys (2.02%), water (1.09%), printing (0.45%), energy (0.13%), jewelry (0.05%), and other industrial activities (0.83%).

Industry represents 42.53% of Covasna County's economy. The other main sectors are trade with 30.98%, services 11.38%, agriculture 9.71%, construction 5.78%, and R&D and high-tech 2.63%.

Companies from Covasna County's industry produced in 2014 almost half a billion EUR (477 199 849 EUR) turnover, with a staggering 10.78% increase in volume compared to the preceding year's income.

One of Covasna County's main industrial sectors is the ready-made garment industry, where processing companies are owned by German investors, who started to establish first brown-field investments in 1992, and since then they operate nine factories producing yearly 5 million trousers for brands like Bosch, Meyer, Wegener. Other privately owned companies in the field of textiles, producing different articles; some of them have their own brand, while the others work in lohn systems.

In 2015 the Schweighoffer Holzindustrie started, after investing 150 million EUR in a new plant for primary wood processing. With the rich forested areas, Covasna has a long tradition of sawn timber export and production of furniture and other finished wooden products. Recently created the ProWood Cluster in the interest of the industry.

A few years ago automotive industry suppliers were established, with two new plants producing steering wheels and electric circuits for vehicles. The automotive industry suppliers from Covasna and neighboring Braşov are offers a vast pallet of competitive products, from boards for Mercedes cars to Airbus helicopters, while having a good potential for growth. Nevertheless, is important to mention Poliprod, the French owned family business of Champrenaut Group involved in steel work, locksmithery, welding, machining or the major producer of electric ceramic heaters in Eastern Europe, member of the Canadian Delta Group. This industry can build up its workforce with new students from the large technical university in Brasov.

Covalact is a well-known national dairy product brand, now owned by Dutch investors. Another milk processing plant is under brand Olympus, with Greek investors, establishing its headquarters in the county.

Meat processing companies are the Bertis and Toro Impex, who are regionally active players, while the Norvegian Orkla food producing network has a meat canning plant in Covasna.

Dunapack, a member of the Austrian Prizhorn, supplies corrugated cardboard boxes to almost all industry branches, from FMCG to fruit, vegetables, and electronics.

While IT&C as an industry sector is in emerging state, Covasna County's strategy for development plans to use this field of activity as one pillar for development. Many new start-ups are in the area successful deploying large projects for sound international companies. Many young technicians arrive from universities.

Agriculture represents 4.83% of Covasna County's economy, mainly producing varieties of potatoes, several companies being able to supply selected and packaged crops for hyper-markets. Other agricultural products are rapeseed, grains, and cabbage.

Covasna County, with many mineral water springs, has developed during history a network of spas for treating different health problems, mainly cardio-vascular. There is a good potential for development of this field of health and spa tourism.

Tourism

The main tourist destinations in the county are:
 The city of Sfântu Gheorghe
 The resorts in the mountains around:
 Covasna
 Balványos
 Malnaș-Băi
 Vâlcele
 Șugaș-Băi
 Băile Fortyogo
 Biborțeni
 Ozunca-Bai
 The mountains:
 Baraolt Mountains
 Bodoc Mountains
 Nemira Mountains
 Întorsurii Mountains

Politics 

The Covasna County Council, renewed at the 2020 local elections, consists of 30 counsellors, with the following party composition:

Administrative divisions

Covasna County has two municipalities, three towns and 40 communes. 
Municipalities
Sfântu Gheorghe – capital city; population: 54,312 (as of 2011)
Târgu Secuiesc
Towns
Baraolt
Covasna
Întorsura Buzăului

Communes
Aita Mare
Arcuș
Barcani
Bățani
Belin
Bixad
Bodoc
Boroșneu Mare
Brăduț
Brateș

Brețcu
Catalina
Cernat
Chichiș
Comandău
Dalnic
Dobârlău
Estelnic
Ghelința
Ghidfalău

Hăghig
Ilieni
Lemnia
Malnaș
Mereni
Micfalău
Moacșa
Ojdula
Ozun
Poian

Reci
Sânzieni
Sita Buzăului
Turia
Vâlcele
Valea Crișului
Valea Mare
Vârghiș
Zăbala
Zagon

See also
Former Háromszék County of the Kingdom of Hungary

References

External links
 www.covasna.ro – site of Covasna

 
Counties of Romania
Geography of Transylvania
Hungarian communities in Romania
1968 establishments in Romania
States and territories established in 1968